State Highway 50 (SH 50) is a  state highway in the northeastern part of the U.S. state of Texas. Its southern terminus is at SH 24 and SH 224 near Commerce. Its northern terminus is at SH 34 in Ladonia. It previously extended northward from Ladonia to Honey Grove, concurrent with SH 34, and southward to Interstate 30 (I-30), concurrent with SH 24. The duplications of these highways were removed in 2003 and 2009, respectively.

History

SH 50 was originally proposed on August 21, 1923 as a renumbering of a portion of SH 2 between Henrietta and Bowie, when the route of SH 2 was readjusted farther east. This designation was replaced on September 26, 1939 by U.S. Highway 287 (US 287). SH 50 was designated on May 1, 1965, traveling from I-30 to SH 24, replacing part of Spur 178, FM 513, and FM 499, and all of FM 819 from FM 499 to FM 513, which was cancelled. On December 17, 1970, SH 50 was extended north to Honey Grove concurrent with part of SH 34 and over part of SH 11. On April 27, 2000, SH 50 was rerouted in Commerce. On April 24, 2003, the section concurrent with SH 34 was cancelled. On September 24, 2009, the section concurrent with SH 24 was cancelled.

Major intersections

Spur 50

State Highway Spur 50 (Spur 50) is a state highway located within the city of Burleson in Johnson County. Signed as Renfo Street, the spur extends from Interstate 35W (I-35W) to SH 174. Spur 50 is the main artery though the "Old Town Burleson" historical district. Spur 50 is only signed as such from I-35W and not on the roadway itself.

See also

References

050
Transportation in Hunt County, Texas
Transportation in Fannin County, Texas